Oberrad is a quarter of Frankfurt am Main, Germany. It is part of the Ortsbezirk Süd.

To the north of the district lies the River Main. Beyond it, the Eastern Harbor (Osthafen) of Frankfurt in the Ostend borough. To the northeast, Oberrad is bordered by Offenbach's Kaiserlei district, to the south and west lie parts of Frankfurt-Sachsenhausen.

References

Districts of Frankfurt